Glowing eyes can refer to:

 Tapetum lucidum, a layer of tissue in the eye that reflects visible light back through the retina
 Glowing Eyes (film), a 2002 French film
 "Glowing Eyes", a song by Twenty One Pilots from their album Regional at Best, later rereleased on the bonus tracks version of the album Vessel